Anantapur revenue division (or Anantapur division) is an administrative division in the Anantapur district of the Indian state of Andhra Pradesh. It is one of the 3 revenue divisions in the district with 12 mandals under its administration. The divisional headquarters is located at Anantapur.

Administration 
There are 12 mandals administered under Anantapur revenue division are:

See also 
List of revenue divisions in Andhra Pradesh

References 

Revenue divisions in Anantapur district